Hellinsia wamenae is a species of moth in the genus Hellinsia, known from Indonesia. Moths in this species take flight in October, and have a wingspan of approximately 16-18 millimetres. The species is named after Wamena, a village whence it was collected.

References

wamenae
Moths of Indonesia
Endemic fauna of Indonesia
Moths described in 2003